Bo Hardegree (born July 5, 1984) is an American football coach who is the quarterbacks coach for the Las Vegas Raiders. He most recently was an offensive assistant for the New England Patriots. He has  served as the quarterbacks coach for the Miami Dolphins, and as an assistant coach for the Denver Broncos, Chicago Bears, and New York Jets.

Playing career

Bo played quarterback at Tennessee from 2004 to 2007.

References

1984 births
Living people
American football quarterbacks
Tennessee Volunteers football players
Duke Blue Devils football coaches
LSU Tigers football coaches
Denver Broncos coaches
Chicago Bears coaches
Miami Dolphins coaches
New England Patriots coaches
Las Vegas Raiders coaches